Zeke Moore may refer to:

 Zeke Moore (American football) (born 1943), American football player
 Zeke Moore (basketball) (born 1997), Trinidadian-American basketball player